Cowey is a surname. Notable people with the surname include:

Alan Cowey (1935–2012), British scientist and academic
Bernard Cowey (1911–1997), English rugby union footballer
Chris Cowey (born 1961), English television producer
Edward Cowey (1839–1903), British trade unionist